Donald Clark Osmond (born December 9, 1957) is an American singer, dancer, actor, television host and former teen idol. He first gained fame performing with four of his elder brothers as the Osmonds, earning several top ten hits and gold albums. Then, in the early 1970s, Osmond began a solo career, earning several additional top ten songs.

He further gained fame due to the success of the 1976–1979 variety series Donny & Marie. The Donny & Marie duo also released a series of top ten hits and gold albums and hosted a syndicated and Daytime Emmy Award–nominated 1998–2000 talk show. Most recently, Donny & Marie retired from headlining an 11-year Las Vegas residency at the Flamingo Las Vegas (2008–2019).

He also successfully competed on two reality TV shows, winning season 9 of Dancing with the Stars and being named runner-up for season 1 of The Masked Singer. He also hosted the game show Pyramid from 2002 to 2004.

Early life
Osmond was born on December 9, 1957 in Ogden, Utah, the seventh child of Olive May (née Davis; 1925–2004) and George Virl Osmond (1917–2007). He is the brother of Alan, Jay, Jimmy, Merrill, Wayne, Marie, Tom, and Virl Osmond. Alan, Jay, Merrill, Wayne, and Donny were members of the popular singing group the Osmonds (known as the Osmond Brothers before Donny joined them). Osmond was raised as a member of the Church of Jesus Christ of Latter-day Saints in Utah along with his siblings. Osmond has traced some of his family ancestry back to Merthyr Tydfil in Wales; his journey was documented in a BBC Wales program, Donny Osmond Coming Home. On the BBC's The One Show, a plaque was unveiled in the town to commemorate 'the ancestors of Donny Osmond.' In his youth, Osmond held a ham radio license, KA7EVD.

Music career

Teen idol: 1971–1978

Andy Williams' father, Jay Emerson Williams, saw the Osmond Brothers (Alan, Wayne, Merrill and Jay) perform on a Disneyland televised special as a barbershop quartet. In short order, the group was invited to audition for The Andy Williams Show. Williams initially had reservations about featuring children on the program, however, encouraged by his father to try them out, they proved in a short period of time to become an asset to the program, and soon became regulars on the show and gained popularity quickly. In 1963, Donny Osmond made his debut on the show at the age of five singing "You Are My Sunshine". The brothers continued to perform on the show throughout the 1960s along with a visit from their sister Marie.

Osmond became a teen idol in the early 1970s as a solo singer, while continuing to sing with his older brothers. Osmond was one of the biggest "Cover Boy" pop stars for Tiger Beat magazine and 16 magazine in the early 1970s. His first solo hit was a cover of Roy Orbison's 1958 recording of "Sweet and Innocent", which peaked at No. 7 in the U.S. in 1971. Osmond's follow-ups Steve Lawrence’s "Go Away Little Girl" (1971) (U.S. No. 1), Paul Anka’s "Puppy Love" (U.S. No. 3), and "Hey Girl/I Knew You When" (U.S. No. 9) (1972) vaulted him into international fame, further advanced by his November 20, 1972 appearance on the Here's Lucy show, where he sang Nat King Cole’s "Too Young" to Lucy's niece, played by Eve Plumb, and sang with Lucie Arnaz ("I'll Never Fall in Love Again").

Comeback: 1989–1990
In the 1980s, all of the Osmonds abandoned their earlier image that had originally been crafted to appeal to young viewers, hoping to reach a more adult audience. While his brothers moved toward country music to modest success, Donny was able to revive his career in popular music. He made an unlikely appearance as one of several celebrities and unknowns auditioning to sing for guitarist Jeff Beck in the video for Beck's 1985 single "Ambitious" – which was produced by Paul Flattery and directed by Jim Yukich – followed in 1986 by an equally unlikely cameo in the animated Luis Cardenas music video "Runaway". He spent several years as a performer, before hiring the services of music and entertainment guru Steven Machat, who got Osmond together with English singer-songwriter Peter Gabriel to see whether Machat and Gabriel could turn the TV Osmond's image into a contemporary young pop act.  They succeeded, returning Osmond to the US charts in 1989 with the Billboard Hot 100 No. 2 song "Soldier of Love" (originally announced on radio stations as "from a mystery singer") and its top twenty follow-up "Sacred Emotion". Launching an extensive tour in support of the Eyes Don't Lie record, he enlisted Earth Wind & Fire and Kenny Loggins guitarist Dick Smith along with keyboardist Mark Jackson.

Current music career: 1991–present
Osmond was the guest vocalist on Dweezil Zappa's star-studded version of the Bee Gees' "Stayin' Alive" which appeared on Zappa's 1991 album Confessions. The song also included guitar solos from Zakk Wylde, Steve Lukather, Warren DeMartini, Nuno Bettencourt, and Tim Pierce. Osmond sang "No One Has To Be Alone", which was heard at the end of the film The Land Before Time IX: Journey to Big Water. He also sang "I'll Make a Man Out of You" for Disney's Mulan.

In the 2000s, he released a Christmas album, an album of his favorite Broadway songs, and a compilation of popular love songs. In 2004, he returned to the UK Top 10 for the first time as a solo artist since 1973, with the George Benson-sampling "Breeze On By", co-written with former teen idol Gary Barlow, from the 1990s UK boy band Take That, reaching number 8.

His 17th solo album (and 61st album including those with his siblings) The Soundtrack of My Life features a collection of cover songs with personal meaning to Osmond. He enlisted Stevie Wonder to play harmonica on track "My Cherie Amour".

Donny & Marie in Las Vegas

Following Marie's stint on Dancing with the Stars in 2007, the pair teamed up for a limited six-week engagement in Las Vegas. The residency began in September 2008, but proved so successful that it was ultimately extended for an eleven-year run through November 2019. Donny and Marie performed at the 750-seat showroom at the Flamingo Hotel. "Donny & Marie" was a 90-minute show. The singing siblings were backed by eight dancers and a nine-piece band. Donny and Marie sang together at the beginning and end of the show, and had solo segments in between. The Flamingo Hotel's showroom was updated in 2014 and renamed the Donny and Marie Theater.

Osmond and the show earned three of the Las Vegas Review-Journals Best of Las Vegas Awards in 2012 including "Best Show", "Best All-Around Performer" (Donny & Marie), and "Best Singer". Osmond earned "Best Singer" for a second time in the Las Vegas Review-Journals Best of Las Vegas Awards in 2013.

Film, radio and television

Donny & Marie
In 1974, Osmond and his sister Marie co-hosted The Mike Douglas Show for a week. Fred Silverman offered them a show of their own, The Donny & Marie Show, a television variety series which aired on ABC between 1976 and 1979. In honor of their impact on American pop culture, Donny and Marie received the Pop Culture Award at the 2015 TV Land Awards. In the past, Osmond has expressed regret that the show was canceled, not that he and Marie decided when to end the show.

Donny and Marie also co-hosted an eponymous and syndicated talk show Donny & Marie from 1998 to 2000. They would occasionally perform with musical guests. Though they received back-to-back nominations for the Daytime Emmy Award for Outstanding Talk Show Host in 2000 and 2001, the show was canceled.

Other hosting opportunities
For two seasons in the US, Osmond hosted Pyramid (2002–2004), a syndicated version of the Dick Clark-hosted television game show. He reprised hosting for a British version of Pyramid on Challenge in 2007. For his performance on Pyramid, Osmond was nominated for a Daytime Emmy Award for Outstanding Game Show Host in 2003; the award went to Alex Trebek.

Osmond is one of two game show hosts to host two different versions of the same game show in different countries; the other being Howie Mandel for Deal or No Deal.

Osmond returned to ABC as host of The Great American Dream Vote, a primetime reality-game show that debuted in March 2007. After earning lackluster ratings in its first two episodes, the program was canceled.

Osmond hosted the daytime British version of the game show Identity on BBC Two.

On April 11, 2008, he hosted the 2008 Miss USA Pageant in Las Vegas with his sister Marie.

He appeared on Entertainment Tonight as a commentator covering the ABC show Dancing with the Stars during his sister Marie's run as a contestant on the 5th season of the American version of the show in 2007.

Music
Osmond is mentioned in the lyrics of Alice Cooper's song "Department of Youth" on the album Welcome to My Nightmare. As the song fades, Cooper can be heard asking the youth choir backing him up, "Who's got the power?" to which a crowd of young people screams "We do!" After a couple of repetitions, this changes to "We've got the power" with a cheering response. On the final repetition, Cooper changes the question to "...and who gave it to you?" The crowd answers, "Donny Osmond!" Cooper then responds "What?!"

Osmond is featured in the song "Start the Par-dee" with Lil Yachty. His most iconic line is "My name is Donny O, and you know I love my ravio's".

Musical theater

His first foray into Broadway musical theater was the lead role in a revival of the 1904 George M. Cohan show Little Johnny Jones. Osmond replaced another former teen idol, David Cassidy, who left the show while it was on its pre-Broadway tour. After 29 previews and only one performance, the show closed on March 21, 1982.

Osmond found success in musical theater through much of the 1990s when he starred as Joseph in Joseph and the Amazing Technicolor Dreamcoat for over 2,000 performances beginning in July 1992 in the Elgin Theatre's Toronto production. He relocated to Chicago where Joseph played for 16 months in 1993–94. During his performances for the musical, he suffered from social anxiety disorder, which caused him to feel light-headed and extremely nervous during his performances. In 1997, Osmond left his starring role in the tour to participate with his family in the cast of the Hill Cumorah Pageant. Creator Andrew Lloyd Webber later chose Osmond to star in the 1999 film version.

He returned to Broadway on September 19, 2006 as Gaston in Disney's Beauty and the Beast. He was scheduled to perform for nine weeks, but due to popular demand, he extended his run through December 24. Liz Smith of the New York Post wrote, "I am here to tell you he is charmingly campy, good-looking and grand as the villain 'Gaston', patterned after our old friend Elvis", and noting "Donny is divine". On July 29, 2007, Osmond played Gaston again for the final performance of Beauty and the Beast.

Osmond and his sister Marie starred in a holiday production called Donny & Marie – A Broadway Christmas, originally scheduled to play on Broadway at the Marquis Theatre December 9–19, 2010. The show extended until December 30, 2010 and again until January 2, 2011. Donny & Marie – Christmas in Chicago played the Ford Center for the Performing Arts Oriental Theatre in Chicago from December 6–24, 2011. It was similar to the 2010 Broadway show. In December 2014, they again performed in a similar Broadway show, receiving very positive reviews.

Film and television
In the animated television series Johnny Bravo, Osmond voiced himself as a recurring character. He has also done guest spots on numerous other television shows such as Friends, Diagnosis: Murder, and Hannah Montana. He also appeared in a Pepsi Twist commercial during the Super Bowl with his sister, Marie, and Ozzy and Sharon Osbourne. In 1982, he co-starred with Priscilla Barnes and Joan Collins in the television movie The Wild Women of Chastity Gulch for Aaron Spelling.

In 1978, he appeared in Goin' Coconuts with sister Marie. His future wife Debbie made a cameo appearance at the end of the film.

In 1998, Osmond was chosen as the singing voice of Shang in Disney's Mulan. He sang "I'll Make a Man Out of You".

Also in 1999, he starred as Joseph in the movie version of Joseph and the Amazing Technicolor Dreamcoat by Andrew Lloyd Webber's request who said, "to me, there is no better selection."

In 2002, he sang "No One Has to Be Alone" for the end credits of The Land Before Time IX: Journey to Big Water.

In the Bob the Builder special "Built to be Wild", he played Jackaroo the pickup truck.

Osmond remarked in an interview that his movie appearance on College Road Trip and upcoming appearances on two Disney Channel shows would mean that he would be coming full circle since he and his family were discovered by Walt Disney.

Osmond appears in the music video of "Weird Al" Yankovic's song "White & Nerdy". The song is a parody of Chamillionaire's "Ridin'"; Osmond's role is analogous to that of Krayzie Bone's role in the original video. Yankovic asked Osmond to appear because "if you have to have a white and nerdy icon in your video, like who else do you go for?"

In February 2019, he was revealed to have portrayed "Peacock" on  The Masked Singer where he was the runner-up.

Osmond was a guest on Kevin Nealon's web series on YouTube, Hiking with Kevin, in March, 2019.  The webisode begins with the two hiking and through the snow at the Sundance Resort in Utah, and ends with them walking a crowded Las Vegas Strip until Osmond brings Nealon backstage at the Donny & Marie Showroom in the Flamingo Hotel, at which he was to perform that evening.

Dancing with the Stars
Osmond and professional Kym Johnson were paired for the ninth season of Dancing with the Stars. He participated in the show to prove he was a better dancer than his sister. It was very difficult for him to manage to get to rehearsals and host his show in Las Vegas with sister Marie. For the first week, the two were assigned to dance a Foxtrot and a 30-second Salsa. His Foxtrot was said to be "too theatrical" and was scored 20/30 from the judges. He, however, managed to maintain a good score when his Salsa scored 10 points and was safe that week. He danced a Jive the following week which was guest judged by Baz Luhrmann. He scored 25 and was scored second place, called first to be safe. That following week he danced a Rumba and scored 21.

After his comments, he "toyed with" openly gay judge Bruno Tonioli, first kissing him, before embracing him and tipping him back in a mock-passionate move after Bruno called Osmond's dance "a bit airy-fairy". The following week introduced four new dances including the Charleston which he danced and scored 24. That following week, the two danced an Argentine Tango which scored 29/30, the highest scored dance to date until it was beaten by then top scorer and future runner-up Mýa and her 70s-themed Samba. He had also received that week's encore.

Following that week, Osmond and Johnson danced a train-station themed Jitterbug and was scored a 24. He then danced a Mambo against all couples and was eliminated 6th receiving seven points for a total of 31/40. The following week, he danced a Quickstep which he quotes "was one of the worst moments of my life" and scored 24 and a Team Tango along with Joanna Krupa and Kelly Osbourne and received 28/30 and the encore.

In the 8th week of competition, Osmond was required to dance a Ballroom and decade-themed Latin dance. His Ballroom Viennese Waltz received 26 but his 1980s themed Paso Doble received 24 being quoted by judge Len Goodman as "the scariest, bizarre Paso Doble we've ever seen" being awarded the last place on the judges' leaderboard for the first time. Following that week, he danced a Tango and got advice from past runner-up Gilles Marini. He got tangled in Johnson's dress and received 21 and saying the cause was that "I saw Marie." He then danced the samba to a song originally recorded by his brothers and himself called "One Bad Apple", receiving 26 and a Jitterbug scored 27. He once again was scored last place.

For the finals week, he danced a Cha-Cha-Cha (27), a Megamix dance alongside Mya and Kelly Osbourne (28), the only perfect-scoring Freestyle (30) and a repeat of his Argentine Tango (30) and won the competition. As he accepted his trophy, he hugged fellow finalist Mya and grabbed his wife, Debbie, and his sister, Marie, on stage.

On Season 18, he guest judged week five on Disney Night. In October 2014, he guest judged on the British version of the show, Strictly Come Dancing, on week 3 (movie week) of the 12th series.

Public image
Osmond states that he has had a tremendous public-image struggle since Donny & Marie ended in 1979. Reviews from Allmusic noted that while Osmond remained a gifted singer, a series of creative missteps in the late 1970s led to his virtually disappearing from the public eye during the 1980s. He was described in the 1980s as having an "unhip image", and he said he was embarrassed that the Osmond name was not considered cool. A publicist suggested that Osmond purposely plan an arrest for drug possession in order to change his image. "I remember hiring a publicist who figured out this whole campaign to get me busted for drugs and change my image."

In March 2010, Osmond criticized Lady Gaga and Beyoncé for using profanity and sex in their "Telephone" video.

Personal life
On May 8, 1978, Osmond married Debra (née Glenn) of Billings, Montana, in the Salt Lake Temple. Together they have five sons: Don, Jeremy, Brandon, Christopher, and Joshua. The Osmonds became grandparents in 2005 and have 13 grandchildren.

Like the rest of his family, Osmond is a member of the Church of Jesus Christ of Latter-day Saints. In retrospect, he has written, "It would have been nice to be able to have served a regular full-time mission, but when I was of that age, my career was such that everyone, including my parents and the leaders of the church, thought that I could do a lot of good in the world by continuing to be in the public eye, by living an exemplary life and sharing my beliefs in every way that I could." He continues sharing his beliefs in an extensive letters-and-comments portion of his website.

Osmond commented on his opposition to same-sex marriage after the 2008 Proposition 8 in California. Latter-day Saints were one of many groups that supported Proposition 8 (to ban same-sex marriage), and Osmond stated that he opposes same-sex marriage but that he does not condemn homosexuality. He believes that homosexuals should be accepted in the LDS Church if they remain celibate.

He stated on his website:

Osmond's two oldest brothers are deaf, and a nephew (Justin) is hearing impaired. He has talked about the experience of growing up with his brothers and their use of sign language when performing together.

Discography

Studio albums
 The Donny Osmond Album (1971)
 To You with Love, Donny (1971)
 Portrait of Donny (1972)
 Too Young (1972)
 Alone Together (1973)
 A Time for Us (1973)
 Donny (1974)
 Disco Train (1976)
 Donald Clark Osmond (1977)
 Donny Osmond (1989)
 Eyes Don't Lie (1990)
 Christmas at Home (1998)
 This Is the Moment (2001)
 Somewhere in Time (2002)
 What I Meant to Say (2004)
 Love Songs of the 70s (2007)
 The Soundtrack of My Life (2015)
 Start Again (2021)

Filmography

Television

Films

References

External links

Donny Osmond Official website

Osmond Interview on Fox News Radio
Osmondheaven Popular Fan Site

1957 births
Living people
20th-century American male actors
20th-century American singers
21st-century American male actors
21st-century American singers
American child singers
American contemporary R&B singers
American country rock singers
American country songwriters
American game show hosts
American keyboardists
American male child actors
American male dancers
American male film actors
American male musical theatre actors
American male pop singers
American male singers
American male songwriters
American male television actors
American male voice actors
American people of Welsh descent
American pop rock singers
American soul singers
Child pop musicians
Dancing with the Stars (American TV series) winners
Decca Records artists
Latter Day Saints from California
Latter Day Saints from Utah
Male actors from California
Male actors from Orange County, California
Male actors from Utah
MGM Records artists
Musicians from Ogden, Utah
Musicians from Orange County, California
Osmond family (show business)
Participants in American reality television series
People from Ogden, Utah
Singers from California
Singers from Utah
Songwriters from California
Songwriters from Utah
Television personalities from California
The Osmonds members
Universal Music Group artists